Anima Noir is the eighth studio album by the Italian gothic metal band Theatres des Vampires.

Track listing

Personnel 

Sonya Scarlet − vocals
Fabian Varesi − keyboards and backing vocals
Gabriel Valerio − drums
Zimon Lijoi − bass
Stephan Benfante − guitars

Guest members 

Hanna Kej − backing vocals, songwriting on tracks 1, 6 and 7
Christian Ice − backing vocals, production and extra arrangements
Luca Bellanova (Starkiller sound) − backing vocals and extra arrangements
Icy X − songwriting on tracks 8 and 9

References

Theatres des Vampires albums
2008 albums